Julie Rogers is a British singer.

Julie Rogers may also refer to:
Julie Rogers (Paralympian), British para athlete, volleyball player
Julie Rogers (Charlie's Angels), fictional character in Charlie's Angels
Julie Rogers, character in Sensation Hunters (1945 film)
Julie Rogers, fictional character in Castle played by Erin Krakow
Julie Rogers, fictional character in Knight Rider played by Julianne McNamara
Julie Rogers Theater, Texas
Julie Rogers, candidate in 2008 Michigan State House elections